The 1875 Kaiapoi by-election was a by-election held on 30 October 1875 during the 5th New Zealand Parliament in the Canterbury electorate of .

The by-election was caused by the resignation of the incumbent MP John Studholme on 8 December 1874.

The by-election was won by Charles Bowen.

Results
The following table gives the election result:

Notes

Kaiapoi 1875
1875 elections in New Zealand
Politics of Canterbury, New Zealand
October 1875 events